Bury Walls is an Iron Age hillfort about  south-east of Weston-under-Redcastle, in Shropshire, England. It is a scheduled monument.

Description
The fort is on a promontory facing south-west, part of the southern escarpment of a sandstone ridge.

Elsewhere there is a single rampart around the edge of the promontory, about  along the east side and up to  along the west side.

From the enclosure there are extensive views to the south, and there is a natural spring within the enclosure.

Excavation and surveys
In 1930 there was some excavation of the site by E. W. Bowcock. It was found that the bedrock at the entrance was cut by cart ruts. To the right of the entrance there were two areas of broken stone, perhaps indicating hearths, and a possible quern-stone. Near the centre of the interior, foundations of a building were discovered, thought at the time to be medieval, but more recently thought to be the remains of a Romano-Celtic temple.

In 1999 and 2000 there were geophysical and topographical surveys. In the northern part of the interior, there was evidence of a series of large concentric terraces; the material taken during their creation was apparently used for the defences.

See also
 Hillforts in Britain
 Geology of Shropshire

References

Hill forts in Shropshire
Scheduled monuments in Shropshire